The surname "Lyall" is found early in Scotland and was derived from the Old Norse given name "Liulfr", where "ulfr" means Wolf. After the Viking settlement in Scotland name sounds would have changed. For example, "Liulfr" is pronounced 'lee-oolv-ur', but after time probably softened in pronunciation to 'lee-ooler' and then 'loo-il' and finally 'lyall' after the Old Norse "R" was dropped off the end. The Lyall Clan is a Sept of Clan Sinclair a Highland Scottish clan of Norman origin a people descended from Norse Vikings who held lands in the north of Scotland, the Orkney Islands, and the Lothians.

Notable people with the surname Lyall include:

 Alfred Comyn Lyall (1835–1911), British civil servant and poet
 Bill Lyall (born 1941), Canadian politician
 Billy Lyall (1953–1989), Scottish musician with the band Pilot
 Charles James Lyall (1845–1920), English civil servant working in India
 Charles Ross Lyall (1880–1950), British career soldier and cricketer
 David Lyall (1817–1895), Scottish botanist 
 Gavin Lyall (1932–2003), English author of espionage novels
 Geoffrey Lyall  (born 1949), bass player for the Dead Kennedys
 George Lyall Sr. (1779–1853), Chairman of the Honourable East India Company 
 Graeme Lyall (born 1942), Australian musician, composer and arranger
 James Lyall (minister) (1827–1905), Presbyterian minister in South Australia.
 James Broadwood Lyall (1838–1916), administrator in the Indian Civil Service, brother of Sir Alfred
 John Edwardes Lyall (1811–1845), British lawyer, Advocate-General of Bengal, son of George Lyall
 Laura Muntz Lyall (1860–1930), Canadian impressionist painter
 Paul Lyall (1944–2021), British para table tennis player
 Sarah Lyall (born c. 1963), American journalist in England
 William Lyall (disambiguation)

See also
 Lyall (disambiguation)
 Lyall (name)
 Charles Lyell (17971875), British lawyer and geologist